Anybody's Goat is a 1932 American Pre-Code comedy film directed by Fatty Arbuckle and starring Monte Collins.

Cast
 Monte Collins

See also
 List of American films of 1932
 Fatty Arbuckle filmography

External links

1932 films
1932 comedy films
1932 short films
Films directed by Roscoe Arbuckle
American black-and-white films
American comedy short films
1930s English-language films
1930s American films